The 2016 Deutschland Cup was the 27th edition of the tournament.

Teams

Standings

Results
All times are local (UTC+1).

References

External links
Official website

Deutschland Cup
Deutschland Cup
2016
Deutschland Cup